Pure Mood is the fourth studio album by American shoegaze band Ringo Deathstarr. It was released in December 11, 2015 by Vinyl Junkie Recordings in Japan, and on January 20, 2016 by The Reverberation Appreciation Society (RVRB-024) in North America. The album was recorded in two different locations: Sky Lab in Los Angeles, and Storage Town in Austin, Texas.

Track listing

References

2015 albums
Ringo Deathstarr albums